Patrick McCabe (born 27 March 1955) is an Irish writer. Known for his mostly dark and violent novels set in contemporary—often small-town—Ireland, McCabe has been twice shortlisted for the Booker Prize, for The Butcher Boy (1992) and Breakfast on Pluto (1998), both of which have been made into films.

Biography
McCabe was born in Clones, County Monaghan. He resides in Clones with his artist wife Margot Quinn and two daughters, Katie and Ellen.

Career
McCabe's books include The Butcher Boy (1992) and Breakfast on Pluto (1998), both shortlisted for the Booker Prize. He has written a children's book (The Adventures of Shay Mouse) and several of his radio plays have been broadcast by RTÉ and BBC Radio 4. He wrote a collection of linked short stories, Mondo Desperado, published in 1999. The play Frank Pig Says Hello, which he adapted from The Butcher Boy, was first performed at the Dublin Theatre Festival in 1992 and of course his singles 'Swimming Pool' and 'Ballad of Audrey Dash' and residences at The Bridge Mall Inn and the Mallow Hotel.

McCabe's 2001 novel Emerald Germs of Ireland is a black comedy featuring matricide. Winterwood, published in 2006, was 2007 Hughes & Hughes/Irish Independent Irish Novel of the Year. 2009 saw the publication of The Holy City. The Stray Sod Country was described as "Strangely elegiac, gloriously operatic and driven by (...) wild and savage imagination, (...) an eerie folk tale that chronicles the passing of a generation."

Director and novelist Neil Jordan has adapted both The Butcher Boy and Breakfast on Pluto into films.

Zelig Theatre premiered the play Appointment in Limbo, written by McCabe, in Galway's Town Hall Theatre in 2008. Cathal Cleary directed.

McCabe and film director Kevin Allen are organisers of the Flatlake Festival, a music festival held annually.

List of works
 The Adventures of Shay Mouse (1985)
 Music on Clinton Street (1986)
 Carn (1989)
 The Butcher Boy (1992)
 The Dead School (1995)
 Breakfast on Pluto (1998)
 Mondo Desperado (1999)
 Emerald Germs of Ireland (2001)
 Call Me the Breeze (2003)
 Winterwood (2006)
 The Holy City (2009)
 The Stray Sod Country (2010)
 Hello and Goodbye (2013) (contains two short novels: Hello Mr. Bones and Goodbye Mr. Rat)
 The Big Yaroo (2019)
 Poguemahone (2022)

Notes

External links
 
 King of Bog Gothic, the Guardian, 30 August 2003
  Interview with McCabe and director Neil Jordan for Breakfast on Pluto, January 2006.
  The Patrick McCabe Papers at University of Notre Dame Rare Books and Special Collections.

1955 births
Living people
Alumni of St Patrick's College, Dublin
Irish children's writers
20th-century Irish dramatists and playwrights
21st-century Irish dramatists and playwrights
Irish male dramatists and playwrights
Irish male short story writers
People from Clones, County Monaghan
20th-century Irish novelists
20th-century Irish male writers
Irish male novelists
21st-century Irish novelists
20th-century Irish short story writers
21st-century Irish short story writers
21st-century Irish male writers